Our Man in... is a British documentary television series, filmed in 2011 and broadcast on Channel 4 in 2012. It follows the activities of British consulates in Spain.

Episode 1 
Ibiza - air date 1 March 2012

Episode 2 
The Costas - air date 8 March 2012

Episode 3 
Barcelona and Tenerife - air date 15 March 2012

References

External links

2012 British television series debuts
2012 British television series endings
2010s British documentary television series
Channel 4 documentary series
Television shows set in Spain
English-language television shows